Zyzyura is a genus of flowering plants in the tribe Eupatorieae within the family Asteraceae.

There is only one known species, Zyzyura mayana, native to Victoria Peak in Belize.

References

Eupatorieae
Monotypic Asteraceae genera
Endemic flora of Belize